"W" Hour (Polish: Godzina „W”) was the codename for the date and time that began Operation Tempest in German-occupied Warsaw, and hence the Warsaw Uprising. The exact time was 5:00 PM, 1 August 1944.

Origin 
On 31 July 1944, during a briefing of Home Army's general staff (Komenda Głowna Armii Krajowej) at Panska Street No. 67, General Tadeusz Bór-Komorowski, commander of the Home Army, received a report from General Antoni Chruściel (codename "Monter"), commander of the Warsaw district, regarding a supposed successful Soviet breach of German defenses just outside of the Praga suburb. The information was actually false, but on its basis,at 5:45 PM, Bór-Komorowski gave Chruściel an oral order to begin Operation Tempest on 1 August 1944 at 5:00 PM. The order was given upon Chruściel's request. Jan Stanisław Jankowski, the Government Delegate for Poland, was present, having previously consulted regarding the order with Tadeusz Pełczyński (codename "Grzegorz"), deputy commander, and Leopold Okulicki (codename "Kobra"), chief of staff. Janina Karasiówna was also present.

A few notable individuals were absent during the meeting. Kazimierz Iranek-Osmecki (codename "Heller"), chief of intelligence of the Home Army, Józef Szostak (codename "Filip"), chief of the Operations Unit, and Kazimierz Pluta-Czachowski (codename "Kuczaba"), chief of communications. They all arrived at 6:00 PM when only Komorowski was left to inform the rest of the general staff of the decision. At this time, Komorowski was informed of a German counterattack on Soviet positions outside of Praga, but did not cancel the order.

After returning to his headquarters at Filtrowa Street No. 68, Chruściel gave the following order:
Alarm to District Commanders in person. On 31.7 at 7:00 PM. I command you ON 1.08 at 5:00 PM. Address m. p. District: Jasna 22 ap. 20 opened from hour "W". Delivery of the order must be immediately acknowledged.

Home Army's previous plans for the uprising called for it to begin in the early morning. On 29 July 1944, on Chruściel's request, it was decided that it would start at 5:00 PM. The exact day however was to be chosen a day before fighting were to begin. The choice of the hour was dictated by heavy street traffic (commuters returning from work). The presence of traffic was to be used to make it easier for soldiers to blend in and safely get to their meeting points, as well as to transport guns and ammunition. Additionally at 5:00 PM there would be just enough sunlight left so as make gaining control of designated objects feasible.

1 August 
The order was issued by Chruściel at around 7:00 PM – just an hour before military curfew. As a result, it was delivered between 7:00 and 9:00 AM the next morning to district commanders. Group commanders received it between 9:00 and 13:30 PM. In the afternoon the total number of messengers delivering the order reached 6000.

The order to start the uprising surprised most commanders. There wasn't enough time to retrieve weapons from secret stashes and gather all the soldiers at the meeting points as they were scattered across the entire city. At "W" Hour – 5:00 PM – total mobilization reached 60%.

Not all units managed to keep the mobilization a secret until 5:00 PM. First shots were fired at a German patrol at 13:35 PM on Krasinski Street in Żoliborz by members of Zdzisław Sierpinski's team, who were transporting weapons for a unit of the "Reaper" Group. The Germans quickly brought a tank and a few armored vehicles with machine guns. While sweeping the area, at 5:30 PM on Suzina Street, the German patrol surprised a Polish unit from IV Battalion "Jarosław Dąbrowski" and SOB who were extracting weapons from a stash. SOB commander Włłodzimierz Kaczanowski was killed in that fight. These skirmishes resulted in German control of key intersections of Żoliborz and alerted nearby German units stationed in the Warsaw Citadel and Bielany Airport.

The fights broke before 5:00 PM in at least 8 different instances across the city.

The Warsaw District Staff of the Home Army, including Antoni Chrusciel, was stationed in an apartment at Jasna Street No. 20 up until 5:00 PM when it moved to captured Hotel Victoria (No 26). The HQ along with Tadeusz Komorwski cn. Bor was stationed in the Kemler furniture factory building at 72 Dzielna Street.

Incoming reports on the situation in the city convinced general Reiner Stahel – military commander of Warsaw – to declare an alarm for the Warsaw Garrison at 4:30 PM. The Germans however were unable to stop the uprising from happening.

Commemorations 
 July 2004 – stairs leading to the Warsaw Uprising Mound were named "The Hour "W" Avenue"
 A memory plaque was placed on the building at 68 Filtrowa Street, where Antoni Chrusciel "Monter" signed the original order
 Every year in Warsaw and other parts of Poland on 1 August at 5:00 PM alarm signals and sirens are turned on. Public transport, buses, tramways, many cars and pedestrians stop in silence. At the same time a ceremony starts at the Gloria Victis Monument in the Powazki Military Cemetery.

Present use 
A term the "W" hour is commonly used in everyday situations to describe unavoidable, important events.

References 

Warsaw Uprising